A list of films produced by the Ollywood film industry based in Bhubaneswar in the 1950s:

References

1950s
Ollywood
Films, Ollywood